Guy Lacey is an American rock guitarist, singer and songwriter. He is best known for his work with Seattle grunge rock band War Babies in the 1990s and with American punk rock outfit Sledgeback in the 2000s. He recorded the one and only album of War Babies, released on Columbia Records in 1992 including the song "In the Wind" which features in the 1992 film Buffy the Vampire Slayer, the forerunner to the later successful TV series. Lacey joined Sledgeback in 2006. His signature guitar style became an important part of Seattle punk rock stalwarts Sledgeback.

Discography
War Babies - War Babies (1993)
Perception Becomes Reality - Sledgeback (2006)
Reality Bites - Sledgeback (2010)

Videos
Hang Me Up - War Babies (1992)
Blue Tomorrow - War Babies (1992)
Werewolf Love - Sledgeback (2006)

Music credits
Buffy The Vampire Slayer - "In The Wind" (Guitar)

References

External links
Hang me up -War babies video
Blue tomorrow- War babies video
A War babies site
Guy Lacey on CD Universe
Guy Lacey in Aardshock (Dutch) magazine with Sledgeback
Werewolf love- Sledgeback video

American punk rock guitarists
Living people
American male guitarists
Year of birth missing (living people)
Musicians from Seattle